Marahamnen is a village in Kalix Municipality, Norrbotten County, Sweden.

Populated places in Kalix Municipality
Norrbotten